Sabzuiyeh (also Romanized as Sabzū’īyeh and Sabzoo’eyeh; also known as Sabzu) is a village in Howmeh Rural District, in the Central District of Bam County, Kerman Province, Iran. At the 2006 census, its population was 138, in 36 families.

References 

Populated places in Bam County